Baardsen or Bårdsen is a Norwegian surname. Notable people with the surname include:

Arnfinn Bårdsen (born 1966), Norwegian judge
Espen Baardsen (born 1977), American soccer player
Gjest Baardsen (1791–1849), Norwegian outlaw and writer

See also
Baardson

Norwegian-language surnames